The Shire of Warracknabeal was a local government area about  west-northwest of Bendigo and  north of Horsham, in western Victoria, Australia.

History

The Warracknabeal area was initially within the St Arnaud Road District, first created in 1861, which became a Shire in 1864. On 30 January 1891, its West Riding was severed to create the Shire of Borung. Several boundary changes occurred between 1891 and 1916:

 12 May 1893 - Borung annexed the East Riding of the Shire of Dimboola, which became the West Riding.
 22 May 1896 - Parts of Borung was annexed by the Shire of Birchip.
 29 May 1896 - Borung lost part of its North and West Ridings, which became the Shire of Karkarooc, but gained part of the Shire of Wimmera. This addition was adjusted on 9 April 1897.
 21 May 1916 - Borung lost parts of its East and South Ridings to the Shire of Dunmunkle, to form that Shire's North Riding.

On 7 September 1938, Borung was formally renamed Warracknabeal.

On 20 January 1995, the Shire of Warracknabeal was abolished, and along with parts of the Shires of Dunmunkle, Karkarooc and Wimmera, was merged into the newly created Shire of Yarriambiack.

Wards

Warracknabeal was divided into three ridings on 10 November 1987, each of which elected three councillors:
 North West Riding
 North East Riding
 South East Riding

Towns and localities

* Council seat.

Population

* Estimate in the 1958 Victorian Year Book.

References

External links
 Victorian Places - Warracknabeal

Warracknabeal